Zeugomantispa is a genus of mantidflies in the family Mantispidae. There are at least three described species in Zeugomantispa.

Species
These three species belong to the genus Zeugomantispa:
 Zeugomantispa compellens (Walker, 1860)
 Zeugomantispa minuta (Fabricius, 1775) (green mantisfly)
 Zeugomantispa virescens (Rambur, 1842)

References

Further reading

External links

 

Hemerobiiformia
Articles created by Qbugbot